The Fiat Barchetta (Type 183) is a roadster produced by the Italian manufacturer Fiat from 1995 to 2005. Barchetta in Italian means "little boat", and also denotes a type of open-top sports car body style.

History

The Barchetta was developed between 1990 and 1994 under the project name Tipo B Spider 176. It was designed by Andreas Zapatinas and Alessandro Cavazza, under the supervision of Peter Barrett Davis and other car designers at the Centro Stile Fiat, and prototyping was carried out by Stola.

Production began in February 1995 and lasted until June 2005, with a brief pause, due to the bankruptcy of coachbuilder Maggiora. The Barchetta was based on the chassis of the Mark 1 Fiat Punto, but with shortened wheelbase. The Barchetta has 1,747 cc DOHC petrol engine fitted with variable valve timing.

It came in various trim levels which offered different features, for example, diamond cross stitch, patterned red leather instead of the standard black leather or fabric seats, alloy wheels instead of steel wheels, or fog-lights as an option. Arguably one of the biggest external cosmetic changes was made by the addition of the third brake light, first introduced by Fiat on the Lido and Riviera in 2000, and on sub models thereafter.

The Barchetta was revised in August 2003 ahead of its relaunch the following year, with some alterations inside and out. The most notable changes were the revised front spoiler and rear bumper. Production of the car eventually stopped in June 2005.

Production
Car bodies were welded at ILCAS in Sparone Canavese, and final assembly was done in Chivasso by the coachbuilder Maggiora. After Maggiora's bankruptcy in May 2002, Fiat relocated production of the Barchetta to its Mirafiori plant and resumed production two years later. Around 57,700 cars were built up to 2005.

Production of the Barchetta was limited to LHD cars only, even though the car was marketed and sold in two RHD markets, the United Kingdom and Japan.

Bertone concept car

The Italian styling house of Bertone created a one off roadster show car for Fiat called the Barchetta in March 2007, at the Geneva Motor Show.

References

External links

www.fiatforum.com/barchetta - International web based club with an active Barchetta owners area FORUM
www.fiatbarchetta.com - unofficial Fiat barchetta website

Barchetta
Roadsters
Sport compact cars
Front-wheel-drive sports cars
2000s cars
Cars introduced in 1995